Naroda is a fast-growing area in Ahmedabad, northeast of central Ahmedabad in the Indian state of Gujarat.

History 
With the establishment of the Naroda Industrial Area in the 1980s, the town flourished; it was incorporated into Ahmedabad in 1996. 

In the twenty-first century Naroda transformed from a neglected industrial area to desirable residential area.

Geography
It is 8 km from Ahmedabad International Airport on the SP Ring Road, Naroda is situated on the emerging Gandhinagar-Ahmedabad-Vadodara (GAV) corridor.

Naroda is near the intersection of National Highway No. 8 and National Highway 59. It is near Bapunagar. Kalupur and Krishnanagar, the geographic center of Ahmedabad, are 5 km away. The Sardar Patel ring road crosses in front of Naroda.

Naroda has two parts: Juna Naroda (Old Naroda) and Nava Naroda (New Naroda). At the center of Naroda (called Naroda Gam or Naroda Bazaar) are an old fountain and a newly developed park.

Demographics 
Naroda is predominantly populated by Hindus and Jains. Most of the residents are Gujaratis. A substantial amount of Sindhis also live there.

Economy 
Naroda has flourished due to its proximity to SVPI (Sardar Vallabh bhai Patel International Airport) Airport and the Ahmedabad Railway Station.

The Naroda GIDC industrial park hosts national and multinational corporations such as Reliance Industries Ltd, PepsiCo, Ingersoll-Rand, Dresser Industries, Lubi Elcectronics, Lubi Pumps, Harshtaiana, Laxmi Engineers Arvind Mills, Umiya Textile and Nirman Textile. Pharmaceutical companies include Dishman, Tuton, Westcoast and Maccure. India's snack food manufacturer Havmor Ice Cream Ltd, Samrat Namkin is located there.

Several major township projects are emerging along the Ahmedabad Vadodara Expressway centered on Naroda. In the 2008 Vibrant Gujarat summit, 24 projects worth more than Rs 1,000 crore were slated to be developed in and along the Ahmedabad-Vadodara expressway. Projects include hospitals, clubs, educational institutions, NRI residential colonies, a business park and a 120-room hotel.

Transport 
Naroda railway station is the main railway station of the town. Kalupur Railway Station is approx 8.5 km), Airport (SVP Airport approx 8 km) and Bus Station (Krishnnagar approx 5 km) are within 10 kilometers of Naroda.

Education 
A government commerce college operates there. Among the many schools are an international school and preschools.

Climate

Culture

Naroda features temples such as the Lord Sankar temple (a historical temple of Shri nareshwar mahadev), Ranchodrai, Satyanarayan and Padmavati Mataji's Jain Temple, Hanumanji Mandir, Ayyappa Temple, Gokuliya Hanuman, Ganesh Temple. It also has Mahaprabhuji's Bethak, a famous pilgrim place for Vaishnavites. It is believed that Mahaprabhu stayed there. Swaminarayan Mandir Vasana Sanstha) temple is there.

Notables
The late business tycoon Dhirubhai Ambani started his first textile mill in Naroda in 1977.

References

Neighbourhoods in Ahmedabad
Cities and towns in Ahmedabad district